Lot 15 is a township in Prince County, Prince Edward Island, Canada.  It is part of Richmond Parish. Lot 15 was awarded to Guy Carleton, 1st Baron Dorchester in the 1767 land lottery.

The township is the only part of the province to have a Francophone majority. According to the 2016 Canadian Census, 780 declared that they spoke English and French, 10 declared they were French unilinguals, and 325 declared they were English unilinguals.

Communities

Incorporated municipalities:

 Abrams Village
 St-Nicholas

Civic address communities:

 Abrams Village
 Baie-Egmont
 Cap-Egmont
 Maximeville
 Mont-Carmel
 St-Chrysostome
 St-Gilbert
 St-Nicholas
 St-Philippe
 St-Raphael
 St-Timothee
 Union Corner
 Urbainville
 Victoria West

References

15
Geography of Prince County, Prince Edward Island